Yalla-y-Poora may refer to:
 Yalla-y-Poora, a town in Shire of Pyrenees, Victoria, Australia
 Yalla-y-Poora, a painting by Eugene von Guerard